Stockton Parish Church is a Church of England parish church located on the High Street in Stockton-on-Tees, County Durham. The church is a Grade I listed building.

History

Chapel-of-ease 

The first church on the site was a chapel-of-ease in the parish of St Mary's Church, Norton, dedicated to St Thomas of Canterbury and constructed around 1237 for the benefit of the growing settlement of Stockton, and located to the South of the current church. Agreement was made during the reign of Bishop Richard Poore between the parishioners of Stockton, Preston-on-Tees and Hartburn and the vicar of Norton to provide a chaplain and allow baptisms and burials at the chapel.

Construction 

In 1663, Revd Thomas Rudd was given responsibility for the chapel, which in 1705 was declared to be "ruinous and too little", given the growth in the settlement of Stockton. The foundation stone for the new church was laid on 5 June 1710, and it opened on 20 March 1712, and was consecrated by Lord Crew on August 21.

On completion of the parish church, an act of parliament was passed (12 Anne, 1713), entitled "An act for making the chapelry of Stockton in the county of Durham, a distinct parish", and the new church became Stockton Parish Church.

Renovations and additions 

A clock and chimes was added in 1736, an organ in 1759, and North gallery in 1748.

The church was restored in 1893, then in 1906 it was reseated, and a chancel added by R J Johnson. This is executed in a "Wrenaissance" style, and is taller than the nave.

A war memorial, designed by H V Lancaster in Portland stone, was constructed in front of the church in 1923. In 1925, a side chapel and choir vestry were added by W D Caröe.

Recent history 

From 1995 until 2002, the church was used for graduations from Durham University's Queen's Campus.

In the early 21st century, the church had suffered a decline in numbers and required substantial repairs, and was threatened with closure. Numbers grew after the appointment of Revd Alan Farish as vicar in 2007, and funds were obtained from English Heritage and other sources to restore the building. It has a Charismatic Evangelical churchmanship.

References 

Grade I listed churches in County Durham
Church of England church buildings in County Durham
Buildings and structures in Stockton-on-Tees
Buildings and structures completed in 1712
Christopher Wren buildings